The Kerteh–Kuantan Port railway line is the only railway line in the East Coast of Peninsular Malaysia. This 77 km long  gauge railway line connects the Petronas oil refinery in Kerteh, Terengganu, to Kuantan Port in Kuantan, Pahang. This railway line crosses the five towns in Kemaman (Kerteh, Kemasik, Ulu Chukai, Binjai and Banggul) in Terengganu and Sungai Karang in Kuantan, Pahang. It was managed by Petronas. The rail operation was terminated on November 2010.

Features
The line features:
Single railway track linking the Petronas refinery complex and the nearby town Kerteh, Terengganu and Gebeng petrochemical complex in Kuantan Port in Kuantan, Pahang
Three depots in Kerteh, Gebeng and Kuantan
Two locomotives
50 wagons with a capacity of 60 metric tons each
Two units of the BGVs

Stations

References

Railway lines in Malaysia
Metre gauge railways in Malaysia